This is a list of buildings that are examples of the Art Deco architectural style in California, United States.

Auburn 
 Auburn City Hall and Fire House, Auburn, 1937
 Auburn Placer Performing Arts Center, Auburn, 1930
 Earl Crabbe Gymnasium, Auburn, 1937

Bakersfield 
 Bakersfield City School District (former Washington Middle School Auditorium), Bakersfield, 1940s
 Central Fire Station, Bakersfield, 1939
 Fox Theater, Bakersfield, 1930
 Kern County Hall of Records, Bakersfield, 1939
 Standard School Auditorium, Bakersfield, 1937

Berkeley 
 82 Shattuck Square, Berkeley, 1926
 Berkeley Community Theatre, Berkeley, 1950
 Berkeley High School, Berkeley, 1935–1939
 Berkeley Iceland, Berkeley, 1940
 Berkeley Public Library, Berkeley
 Edwards Stadium, Berkeley, 1932
 Pacific Film Archive, Berkeley, 1939

Beverly Hills 
 Advance Company Building, Beverly Hills, 1929
 Fine Arts Theatre (former Wilshire Regina Theatre), Beverly Hills, 1937
 Payne Building, Beverly Hills, 1926 and 1936
 Saban Theatre, Beverly Hills, 1930
 Sterling Plaza, Beverly Hills, 1929

Culver City 
 Allied Model Trains, Culver City, 1946
 Beacon Laundry, Culver City, 1931
 Citizens Publishing Company Building, Culver City, 1929
 Helms Bakery Building, Culver City
 U.S. Post Office, Culver Boulevard, 1940

Fresno 
 Azteca Theater, Fresno, 1948
 Crest Theater, Fresno, 1949
 Fresno County Hall of Records, Fresno, 1937
 Fresno Memorial Auditorium, Fresno, 1936
 Fresno Unified School District Administration Building, Fresno, 1936
 Gottschalks Department Store, Fresno, 1914
 Ivory Tower, Mayfair Shopping Center, Fresno, 1945
 L. C. Wesley Super Garage, Fresno, 1931
 Scottish Rite Masonic Temple, Fresno, 1937
 Tower Theatre, Fresno, 1939
 United States Post Office, Fresno, 1939

Glendale 
 Aeroscopic Environmental Inc. Building, Glendale, 1935
 Alex Theatre, Glendale, 1925
 Galilee Mission Center, Glendale, 1930s
 Glendale City Hall, Glendale, 1942
 Grand Central Airport, Glendale, 1923
 Incarnation Catholic Church, Glendale, 1952
 Incarnation Church School, Glendale, 1937
 North Glendale Methodist Church, Glendale, 1941

Long Beach 
 1862 Atlantic Avenue, Long Beach, 1930
 Acres of Books, Long Beach, 1924
 Atlantic Studio, Long Beach, 1933
 Barker Brothers Building, Long Beach, 1929
 Buffums' Autoport, Long Beach, 1941
 Charles A. Lindberg Middle School, Long Beach, 1933
 Dr. Rowan Building (former Bank of Italy), Long Beach, 1930
 Jefferson Junior High School, Long Beach, 1936
 Lafayette Hotel, Long Beach, 1929
 Long Beach Airport, Long Beach, 1923
 Long Beach Main Post Office, Long Beach, 1934
 Long Beach Polytechnic High School Auditorium, Long Beach, 1935
 Long Beach Professional Building, Long Beach, 1929
 Long Beach Skating House (now Palace Lofts), Long Beach, 1929
 Marvin Apartments, Long Beach, 1930
 Merrill Building, Long Beach, 1921
 Municipal Utilities Building, Long Beach, 1932
 Owl Drug Store (now Julian Medical Building), Long Beach, 1934
 , Long Beach, 1936
 Robert Louis Stevenson School, Long Beach, 1936
 Siam Market (former Repp Mott Auction House), Long Beach, 1930
 Soft Water Laundry (now Long Beach Rescue Mission), Long Beach, 1920s
 Thrifty Drug/Famous Department Store, Long Beach, 1929
 Tichenor Orthopedic Clinic for Children, Long Beach, 1938
 United States Post Office Long Beach Main, Long Beach, 1934
 Walkers Department Store, Long Beach, 1929
 Wiese & Wiese Building, Long Beach, 1929

Los Angeles 
 535 South Gramercy Place, Los Angeles, 1931
 3919 West 8th Street, Los Angeles, 1940
 4845 Fountain Avenue, Hollywood, Los Angeles, 1930
 Abraham Lincoln High School, Lincoln Heights, Los Angeles, 1938
 Academy Museum of Motion Pictures, Los Angeles, 1940
 American Legion Post 377, Tujunga, Los Angeles, 1928
 Angelus Temple, Echo Park, Los Angeles, 1923
 Biegler Hall, University of Southern California, Los Angeles, 1940
 Big Town Market, Los Angeles, 1940s
 Black Cat Tavern, Los Angeles, 1939
 Bob's Automatic Transmissions, Los Angeles, 1936
 Bullocks Wilshire, Los Angeles, 1929
 California Bank, Los Angeles, 1930
 Carpenter Community Charter School, Studio City, Los Angeles, 1924
 Cedars of Lebanon Hospital (now Scientology's Big Blue Building), Hollywood, Los Angeles, 1930
 Central Library Goodhue, Los Angeles, 1926
 Coca-Cola Building, Los Angeles, 1939
 Comedy Union Building, Los Angeles, 1930s
 Commercial Laundry Building, Hollywood, Los Angeles, 1928
 Crossroads of the World, Los Angeles, 1936
 Distribution Station No. 28 Department of Water and Power, West Los Angeles, Los Angeles, 1946
 Dominguez-Wilshire Building, Los Angeles, 1931
 E. Clem Wilson Building, Los Angeles, 1929
 E. F. Smith Market, Los Angeles, 1933
 Eastern Columbia Building, Los Angeles, 1930
 El Rey Theatre, Los Angeles, 1936
 Ennis House, Los Feliz, Los Angeles, 1924
 Federal Reserve Bank of San Francisco, Los Angeles Branch, Los Angeles, 1929
 Film Exchange Building, Los Angeles, 1937
 Firestone Tire Company Building, Los Angeles, 1937
 Fox Bruin Theater, Los Angeles, 1937
 Garfield Building, Los Angeles, 1929
 Golden State Mutual Life Insurance Building, South Los Angeles, Los Angeles, 1949
 Good Ship Grace, Los Angeles, 1941
 Grauman's Egyptian Theatre, Hollywood, Los Angeles, 1922
 Green Dog & Cat Hospital, Los Angeles, 1934
 Griffith Observatory, Los Angeles, 1935
 Hattern's Shopping Center (now Scientology Community Center), Los Angeles, 1931
 Hemphill Diesel Engineering School, Los Angeles, 1932–1936
 Hoffman Candy Company, Los Angeles, 1929
 Hollyhock House, East Hollywood, Los Angeles, 1921
 Hollywood American Legion Post 43 Clubhouse, Los Angeles, 1929
 Hollywood & Western Building, Hollywood, Los Angeles, 1928
 Hollywood Bowl, Hollywood Hills, Los Angeles, 1929
 Hollywood Citizen-News Building, Hollywood, Los Angeles, 1931
 Hollywood High School, Hollywood, Los Angeles, 1938
 Hollywood Palladium, Hollywood, Los Angeles 1940
 Hollywood Reporter Building, Los Angeles, 1924 and 1947
 Howard Hughes Headquarters Building, Hollywood, Los Angeles, 1931
 International College of Beauty Arts & Sciences (former Aero Industries Technical Institute), Los Angeles
 James Oviatt Building, Los Angeles, 1927
 Judge Redwine Building, Hollywood, Los Angeles
 Kenneth Hahn Hall of Administration, Los Angeles, 1960
 Los Angeles Central Library, Los Angeles, 1926
 Los Angeles City Hall, Los Angeles, 1928
 Los Angeles County – USC Medical Center, Los Angeles, 1933
 Los Angeles Fire Department Engine Co. No. 1, Los Angeles, 1940
 Los Angeles Memorial Coliseum, Exposition Park, Los Angeles, 1923
 Los Angeles Times Building, Los Angeles, 1935
 Los Feliz Manor Apartments, Los Angeles, 1929
 Los Angeles Center for Enriched Studies, Faircrest Heights, Los Angeles, 1937
 Majestic Crest Theatre, Los Angeles
 Manual Arts High School, Los Angeles, 1910 and 1933
 The Mauretania, Los Angeles, 1934
 Mayan Theater, Los Angeles, 1927
 Milk, Los Angeles, 1931
 Montecito Apartments, Hollywood, Los Angeles, 1930
 Moxley Veterinary, Los Angeles, 1930
 Municipal Water & Power Building, Los Angeles, 1937
 North Hollywood Masonic Temple, Hollywood, Los Angeles, 1949
 Pacific Exchange, Los Angeles, 1930
 Pan-Pacific Auditorium, Los Angeles, 1935
 Pantages Theatre, Hollywood, Los Angeles, 1930
 Park Plaza Hotel, Los Angeles, 1924
 Pellissier Building and Wiltern Theatre, Los Angeles, 1931
 Pickford Center for Motion Picture Study, Los Angeles, 1948
 Producers Film Center (former Good Humor Building), Los Angeles, 1930
 Punch TV Studios, Los Angeles, 1935
 Ravenswood Apartments, Hollywood, Los Angeles, 1912
 Roxie Theatre, Downtown Los Angeles, 1931
 Roxy Theatre, Hollywood, Los Angeles, 1973
 Rush Hour Jewelry, Los Angeles
 Samuel-Novarro House, Los Feliz, Los Angeles, 1927
 San Pedro Ballet School, San Pedro, Los Angeles 1935
 San Pedro High School, San Pedro, Los Angeles, 1936
 San Pedro Municipal Ferry Building, San Pedro, Los Angeles, 1941
 Scully Building, Los Angeles, 1930
 Sears, Roebuck & Company Mail Order Building, Boyle Heights, Los Angeles, 1927
 Security First National Bank, Los Angeles, 1929
 Selig Retail Store, Los Angeles, 1931
 Selma Las Palmas Courtyard Apartments, Hollywood, Los Angeles, 1939
 Sepulveda Dam, Los Angeles, 1941
 Shane Building (former Directors Guild of America), Los Angeles, 1930 Skinner House, Los Angeles, 1937
 Sontag Drug Store (now Wilshire Beauty), Los Angeles, 1935
 Southern California Edison Company Building, Los Angeles
 Southern California Gas Company Complex, Downtown Los Angeles, 1925
 Southwestern Law School, Los Angeles, 1911
 Spring Street Courthouse, Los Angeles, 1940
 Storer House, Hollywood Hills, Los Angeles, 1924
 Sun Realty Company Building (now Los Angeles Jewelry Center), Los Angeles, 1930
 Sunset Tower, Los Angeles, 1931
 Thomas Jefferson High School, South Los Angeles, Los Angeles, 1936
 Title Guarantee and Trust Company Building, Los Angeles, 1930
 Union Station, Los Angeles, 1939
 United States Post Office Hollywood Main, Hollywood, Los Angeles, 1937
 United States Post Office, San Pedro, Los Angeles, 1935
 Van Nuys City Hall, Van Nuys, Los Angeles, 1932
 Venice High School, Los Angeles, 1911
 Venice Police Station, Los Angeles, 1930
 Victor M. Carter House, Los Angeles, 1935
 Village Green, Baldwin Hills, Los Angeles, 1930s–1942
 Vision Theater, Leimert Park, South Los Angeles, Los Angeles, 1931
 Wallace Beery Duplex, Los Angeles, 1936
 Warner Grand Theatre, San Pedro, Los Angeles, 1931
 Wilshire Ward Chapel, Los Angeles, 1929
 Wiltern Theatre, Los Angeles, 1931

Merced 
 Blooming Affair Global & Gifts, Merced, 
 The Mainzer, Merced, 1920s and 1931
 Merced Theatre, Merced, 1931

Napa 
 Bank of Napa (now Wells Fargo), Napa, 1934
 Food City Building (now Family Drug), Napa, 1952
 Oberon Building, Napa, 1893, 1934
 United States Post Office, Napa, 1933

Oakland 
 10th Street Market, Oakland, 1917 and 1926
 347 14th Street, Oakland, 1920s
 Alameda County Courthouse, Oakland, 1939
 Breuner's Building, Oakland, 1931
 Fox Oakland Theatre, Oakland, 1928
 Hill Castle Apartment Building, Oakland, 1930
 I. Magnin Building, Oakland, 1930
 Mary A. Bowles Building, Oakland, 1931
 Oakland Floral Depot (now Uptown nightclub), Oakland, 1923
 Paramount Theatre, Oakland, 1931
 Posey and Webster Street Tubes, Oakland, 1928
 Sears Roebuck & Company, Oakland, 1929

Palo Alto 
 Acme Glass Company, Palo Alto, 1938
 Hoover Pavilion, Palo Alto, 1931
 Stanford Theatre, Palo Alto, 1920s

Pasadena 
 Armory Gallery, Pasadena, 1932
 Bryan's Cleaners, Pasadena, 1938
 Bullock's Pasadena, Pasadena, 1944
 Court at 744–756½ South Marengo Avenue, Pasadena, 1931
 Glenarm Power Plant, Pasadena, 1927
 Grover Cleveland Elementary School, Pasadena, 1934
 Pasadena Winter Garden, Pasadena, 1940
 Rose City Dental Arts, Pasadena, 1932
 Royal Laundry Complex, Pasadena, 1927
 Warner Building (now Linden Optometry), Pasadena, 1927

Sacramento 
 California Transportation Commission, Sacramento, 1939
 Capitol Plaza (former I.O.O.F. Building), Sacramento, 1870 and 1936
 Chando's Cantina, Sacramento, 1948
 Colonial Theatre, Sacramento, 1940
 Crest Theatre, Sacramento, 1946
 Forum Building, Sacramento, 1911
 Frank Fat's Restaurant, Sacramento, 1939
 Grant Union High School Auditorium, Sacramento
 Iceland Skating Rink, Sacramento, 1940
 Lee House, Sacramento, 1941
 Metro Garage (former Greyhound Station), Sacramento
 Odd Cookie (former People's Acceptance Building), Sacramento
 S. H. Kress and Co. Building, Sacramento, 1931
 Sacramento City College Gymnasium and Auditorium, Sacramento, 1937
 Theodore Judah School, Sacramento, 1937
 Tower Bridge, Sacramento, 1935
 Tower Theatre, Sacramento, 1938

San Bernardino 
 Helms Bakery Building, San Bernardino, 1950s
 Landeros Furniture, San Bernardino, 1927
 San Bernardino Tattoo, San Bernardino,

San Diego 
 3090 Polk Avenue, San Diego, 1930
 3489 Noell Street, San Diego, 1940s
 3701 6th Avenue, San Diego, 1930s
 4304 Park Boulevard (former Frank the Train Man), San Diego, 1943
 Architectural Salvage, San Diego, 1930s
 Dalton Building, Gaslamp Quarter, San Diego, 1911 and 1930
 Euclid Tower (now Tower Bar), San Diego, 1932
 Fire Station No. 4, San Diego, 1937
 Ford Building, Balboa Park, San Diego
 McClintock Storage Warehouse, San Diego, 1925
 Municipal Gymnasium, Balboa Park, San Diego, 1935
 Piggly Wiggly (now Krisp Beverages and Natural Foods), San Diego, 1940
 Samuel I. Fox Building, Gaslamp Quarter, San Diego, 1929
 San Diego Athletic Club, San Diego, 1928
 San Diego Central Post Office, San Diego, 1937
 San Diego County Administration Center, San Diego, 1938
 San Diego Firehouse Museum, San Diego, 1920s
 Silverado Ballroom, San Diego, 1931
 Silver Gate Three Stars Masonic Lodge No 296, San Diego, 1931
 Sixth Church of Christ, scientist, San Diego, 1940s or 1950s

San Francisco 
 140 New Montgomery, South of Market, San Francisco, 1925
 450 Sutter Street, San Francisco, 1929
 Administration Building, Treasure Island, San Francisco, 1938
 Balboa Theatre, San Francisco, 1926
 Bank of Italy (now Bank of America), San Francisco
 Beach Chalet, San Francisco, 1925
 Bently Nob Hill, San Francisco, 1924
 Bridge Cafe, San Francisco, 1938
 Bridge Round House, San Francisco, 1938
 Castro Theatre interior, San Francisco, 1922
 Central Tower, San Francisco, 1898, 1938
 Circus Center (former Polytechnic High School Gymnasiums), San Francisco, 1929
 Coit Tower, San Francisco, 1933
 Discount Glass Building, San Francisco, 1936
 Doelger Building, Inner Sunset District, San Francisco, 1932
 Eng-Skll Company, San Francisco, 1930
 Federal Reserve Bank of San Francisco, San Francisco, 1929
 Francis Scott Key Elementary School, San Francisco, 1938
 George Washington High School, San Francisco, 1934–1936
 Golden Gate Bridge, San Francisco, 1937
 Hall of Transportation Building 2, Treasure Island, San Francisco, 1938
 Horseshoe Tavern, San Francisco, 1934
 James Lick Middle School, San Francisco, 1932
 Lakeside Medical Center, San Francisco
 Malloch Building, Telegraph Hill, San Francisco, 1937
 Maritime Museum, San Francisco Maritime National Historical Park, San Francisco, 1936
 McAllister Tower Apartments, San Francisco, 1930
 NBC Studio Building, San Francisco, 1941
 New Mission Theater, San Francisco, 1916
 Ocean Park Motel, San Francisco, 1937
 Omar Khayyam's Restaurant (now Skechers Building), San Francisco
 One Montgomery Tower, San Francisco, 1982
 Palace of Fine and Decorative Arts Building 3, Treasure Island, San Francisco, 1938
 Presidio Theatre, Marina District, San Francisco, 1937
 Rincon Center, San Francisco, 1940
 Roxie Theater, Mission District, San Francisco, 1933
 Sailor's Union of the Pacific, San Francisco, 1950
 San Francisco Galvanizing Works, San Francisco
 San Francisco Mint, San Francisco, 1937
 San Francisco VA Medical Center, San Francisco, 1934
 Sears Roebuck & Co., San Francisco, 1926
 Shell Building, San Francisco, 1929
 Speaker Towers, Aquatic Park Historic District, San Francisco, 1939
 Star of the Sea School, San Francisco, 1940s
 Stock Exchange Tower (now City Club of San Francisco), San Francisco, 1930
 Transbay Terminal, San Francisco, 1939
 United States Appraisers and Stores and Immigration Station, Financial District, San Francisco, 1944
 Verdi Club, San Francisco, 1935

Santa Ana 
 Empire Market Building, Downtown Santa Ana, Santa Ana, 1933
 Horton Furniture Building, Downtown Santa Ana, Santa Ana, 1929
 Old Santa Ana City Hall, Downtown Santa Ana, Santa Ana, 1935
 Santa Ana Performing Arts Event Center, Downtown Santa Ana, Santa Ana, 1923

Santa Monica 
 Charmont Apartments, Santa Monica, 1928
 Georgian Hotel, Santa Monica, 1931
 Santa Monica City Hall, Santa Monica, 1939
 Sears, Roebuck & Company, Santa Monica, 1947
 Shangri-La Apartments, Santa Monica, 1940
 United States Post Office, Santa Monica, 1937
 Vogue Apartments, Santa Monica, 1937
 Voss Apartments, Santa Monica, 1937

Stockton 
 Fox California Theater, Stockton, 1930
 Connell Motor Truck Co., Stockton, 
 United States Post Office, Stockton, 1933

Visalia 
 Department of Public Social Services (former Tulare County Courthouse), Visalia, 1935
 Masonic Temple, Visalia, 1935
 United States Post Office-Visalia Town Center Station, Visalia, 1933

Whittier 
 Cool-A-Coo Building, Whittier, 1930
 Lou Henry Hoover School, Whittier, 193
 National Trust and Savings, Whittier, 1935
 St. Mary of the Assumption Catholic Church, Whittier, 1930
 United States Post Office, Whittier, 1935
 Whittier-Union High School, Whittier, 1940

Other cities 
 6990 Palm Avenue, Highland Historic District, Highland, 1936
 Administrative Building, Sacramento McClellan Airport (former Sacramento Air Depot), Sacramento County, 1936
 Aimee's Castle, Lake Elsinore, 
 Alameda Theatre, Alameda, 1932
 Albany Cinema, Albany, 
 Alex Theatre, Glendale, 1925
 Amador County Courthouse, Jackson Downtown Historic District, Jackson, 1940
 Americanization School/Crown Heights Resource Center, Oceanside, 1931
 Analy High School, Sebastopol, 1935
 Angels 6 Theatre, Angels Camp, 1936
 Arcadia News Journal Building, Arcadia, 1932
 Arcata Theatre Lounge, Arcata, 1937
 Arena Theater, Point Arena, 1928
 Avalon Theatre, Catalina Casino, Santa Catalina Island, 1929
 Avenal Theater, Avenal, 1935
 Aztec Hotel, Monrovia, 1924
 Bank of America, Chico, 1931
 Bank of America, Los Gatos, 1931
 Beekay Theatre, Tehachapi, 1932
 Bella Terra, Huntington Beach, 1965
 Bernardi's Cleaners (now Red Onion restaurant), Alameda, 1946
 Beverly Fabrics, Salinas, 1920s
 Bishop Twin Theatre, Bishop, 1929
 Blue Cross Veterinary Hospital, Signal Hill, 1927
 Boathouse, Alhambra
 Bowling Alley, La Crescenta-Montrose
 Broadway Twin Theatre, Yreka, 1930
 Bubbles Balboa Club, Newport Beach, 1950s
 Bun-N-Burger, San Gabriel, 1941
 Burbank City Hall, Burbank, 1943
 Butte County Hospital, Oroville, 1945
 California Theater, Dunsmuir, 1926
 Cascade Theatre, Redding, 1934
 Catalina Casino, Avalon, 1929
 Christian Science Reading Room, Santa Barbara, 1950
 Christopher B. Smith Rafael Film Center, San Rafael
 City Hall, Hayward, 1930
 City Hall, Livermore, 1875 and 1937
 City Hall, Maywood, 1938
 City Hall, Nevada City, 1937
 Claypool & Co. (now Palo Verde College), Needles, 1930
 Cloverdale Creamery, Fremont, 1927
 Court House, Nevada City Downtown Historic District, Nevada City, 1937
 Cow Palace, Daly City, 1941
 Daily Republic Building, Fairfield
 De Anza Hotel, San Jose, 1931
 De Anza Theatre (S. Charles Lee, Streamline Moderne), 1937–1939
 Dr. George Hein's Residence and Dental Practice (now J&M Hobby House), San Carlos, 1936
 Doheny Courtyard, West Hollywood, 1930s
 Eagles Building, Redondo Beach, 1949
 El Primero Hotel, Chula Vista, 1930
 El Segundo Elementary School, El Segundo, 1936
 Esslinger Building, San Juan Capistrano, 1939
 Esparto High School Auditorium, Esparto
 Eugene C. Jones Veterinary Office, West Hollywood, 1938
 Eureka Theater, Eureka, 1939
 Fine Arts Theatre (former Wilshire Regina Theatre), Beverly Hills, 1937
 First Baptist Church, Ventura, 1932
 First National Trust and Savings Bank, La Mesa, 1942
 Fox Theatre Inglewood, Inglewood, 1949
 Fremont Theater, San Luis Obispo, 1942
 Gamble House, Fullerton, 1940
 Golden Gate Theater, East Los Angeles, Los Angeles County, 1927
 Green's Cleaners, South Gate, 1940
 Hart Theatre, Ferndale, 1920
 Hollywood Park Racetrack building, Streamline Moderne
 Inglewood Memorial Park Buildings, Inglewood, 1933
 KIGS AM Radio Station, Hanford, 1947
 KPH Radio Station, Inverness, 1930
 King City High School Auditorium, King City, 1939
 Lane-Wells Company Building, Huntington Park, 1939
 Lark Theater, Larkspur, 1936
 Leuzinger High School, Lawndale, 1931
 Lido Restaurant, South Gate, 1941
 Loma Linda Foods Building (now Heritage Foods), Riverside, 1937
 Los Baños del Mar, Los Alamos, 1939
 Marconi–RCA Transmitting Station, Bolinas, 1931
 Martinez Downtown Post Office, Martinez, 1939
 Martinez Library, Martinez, 1941
 Metro Diner, Escondido, 1947
 Mitchell Real Estate Building, Grass Valley, 2008–2012
 Modoc Union High School, Alturas, 1939
 Monroe Elementary School, Monrovia, 1930s
 Monterey County Court House, Monterey, 1937
 Mt. Whitney Hotel, Lindsay, 1929
 Napa Auto Parts, Mojave, 1940s
 New Weed Palace Theater, Weed, 1933
 Niles Theater, Alturas, 1937
 North School, Hermosa Beach, 1934
 Oceanside City Hall and Fire Station, Oceanside, 1929
 Orinda Theatre, Orinda
 Pardee Sea Scout Base, Marina Del Rey, 1975
 Petersen's Service Station, Ferndale Main Street Historic District, Ferndale, 1930
 Pier Avenue School, Hermosa Beach, 1939
 Point Hueneme Light, Santa Barbara Channel, 1941
 Pomona Fox Theater, Pomona, late 1920s
 Progress Building, Pomona, 1932
 Puente de Vida Church, Santa Paula, 1950
 Redding Fire House, Redding, 1939
 Richmond Shipyard Number Three Warehouse, Richmond, 1941
 Ritz Building, Eureka
 Rosenberg's Department Store, Santa Rosa, 1937
 Safeway (now Bonanza Tortilleria), Modesto, 1937
 Salinas Californian Building, Salinas, 1949
 San Gabriel Union Church and School, San Gabriel, 1936
 San Luis Obispo County Courthouse, San Luis Obispo, 1940
 Santa Anita Park, Arcadia, 1934
 Santa Cruz Civic Auditorium, Santa Cruz, 1939
 Sebastiani Theatre, Sonoma, 1934
 Senator Theater, Chico, 1928
 Shell Gas Station, La Grange, 1925
 Ship of the Desert, Palm Springs, 1936
 Social and Public Art Resource Center, Venice, 1929
 South Pasadena High School, South Pasadena, 1906
 State Theatre, Red Bluff, 1946s
 Sterling Cleaners, Burlingame, 1926
 Sutter Creek Theatre, Sutter Creek, 1919
 Taft Union High School, Taft, 
 Tate's Tea Room/Carlos Club, San Carlos, 1947
 Thurlow Medical Building, Santa Rosa, 1940
 Torrance High School Auditorium, Torrance, 1924
 Torrance Public Library, Torrance, 1936
 Town & Country Center, Palm Springs, 1948
 Tulare Union High School Auditorium and Administration Building, Tulare, 1937
 Ukiah Main Post Office, Ukiah, 1938
 United States Post Office, Gardena Boulevard, Gardena
 United States Post Office, Hillcrest Avenue, Inglewood 
 United States Post Office, Lancaster, 1940
 United States Post Office, Porterville, 1937
 United States Post Office-Santa Barbara Main, Santa Barbara, 1937
 Urho Saari Swim Stadium, El Segundo, 1940
 Val Vita Food Products, Fullerton, 1939
 Veterans Memorial Building, Corning, 1930s
 W. W. Henry Company Building, Huntington Park, 1939
 Wardrobe Cleaners (now Catalina Coffee Company), Redondo Beach, 1950
 Washington Firehouse (now Burgers and Brew), West Sacramento
 Whittier Union High School, Whittier, 1940

See also 

 List of Art Deco architecture
 List of Art Deco architecture in the United States

References 

 "Art Deco & Streamline Moderne Buildings." Roadside Architecture.com. Retrieved 2019-01-03.
 "Art Deco Society of Los Angeles". Archived from the original on 2015-05-17.
 Cinema Treasures. Retrieved 2022-09-06
 "Court House Lover". Flickr. Retrieved 2022-09-06
 "New Deal Map". The Living New Deal. Retrieved 2020-12-25.
 "Points of Interest Map". Art Deco Society of California. Archived from the original on 2019-01-03. Retrieved 2019-01-03.
 "SAH Archipedia". Society of Architectural Historians. Retrieved 2021-11-21.

External links
 

 
Art Deco
Art Deco architecture in California
California-related lists